María Fernanda Espinosa Garcés (born 7 September 1964) is an Ecuadorian politician and diplomat. She was the President of the United Nations General Assembly for the 73rd session from 2018 to 2019. She served as Minister of Foreign Affairs under President Lenín Moreno from May 2017 to June 2018. She also held several other Ministerial posts before, including as Minister of National Defense of from 28 November 2012 to 23 September 2014. She served as the Permanent Representative of Ecuador to the United Nations in Geneva from 2008 to 2009 and again from October 2014 to May 2017. Besides her political career she is also a poet and essayist.

Personal life
Espinosa was born 7 September 1964 in Salamanca, Spain during a stay of her parent in the city. She is fluent in French and English and has working knowledge of Portuguese. She has interests in poetry and ecology. She studied at Lycée La Condamine in France and graduated in the early 1980s.

Education
She holds a master's degree in Social Science and Amazonic Studies. She also has a postgraduate degree in Anthropology and Political Science from the Facultad Latinoamericano de Ciencias Sociales in Quito and a licentiate in Applied Linguistics from the Pontificia Universidad Católica del Ecuador. Between 1994 and 1997, she conducted doctoral studies in Geography at Rutgers University but did not complete her Ph.D. dissertation.

In addition to that, as a poet, she won the "First National Poetry Prize of Ecuador" in 1990.

Political career
Under President Rafael Correa, Espinosa was Minister for Foreign Affairs, Commerce and Integration from January 2007 to December 2007. She was then Special Adviser to the President of the Constituent Assembly, Alberto Acosta from December 2007 to February 2008 before being appointed as Ecuador's Permanent Representative to the United Nations. She presented her credentials as Permanent Representative on March 7, 2008. From October 2009 till November 2012 she was Minister of Natural and Cultural Heritage, where she led the Yasuní-ITT Initiative.

In November 2012 she got the post of Minister of National Defense as incumbent Minister Miguel Carvajal stepped down to run for the National Assembly elections of 2013. She is the third female to lead the Ministry of National Defense after Guadalupe Larriva and Lorena Escudero. In March 2013 some controversy arose after television channel Ecuavisa reported there was unrest in the military concerning the promotion of certain colonels to generals. President Correa ordered Espinosa to take legal action against Ecuavisa, saying that the information Ecuavisa possessed was false. On 18 March 2013 Ecuavisa apologized and confirmed that basic verification procedures had not been followed. She resigned as Minister on 23 September 2014.

María Fernanda Espinosa represented Ecuador in international negotiation processes on sustainable development, intellectual property rights, indigenous peoples, biodiversity, and climate change. Served as lead negotiator for the United Nations Conference on Sustainable Development (Rio+20), and the United Nations Climate Change Conferences of the Parties in Copenhagen (COP 15), Cancun (COP 16), Paris (COP 21), and Bonn (COP 23), where she led the common position of the 34 members of the Community of Latin American and Caribbean States (CELAC).

In October 2014 Espinosa was named Permanent Representative of Ecuador to the United Nations in Geneva. She succeeded Luis Gallegos. In her capacity as Permanent Representative she defended the case of Julian Assange in a discussion on arbitrary detention in September 2016.

On 24 May 2017 Espinosa was appointed as Minister of Foreign Affairs in the government of President Lenín Moreno.

On June 5, 2018, María Fernanda Espinosa was elected as the fourth woman president of the United Nations General Assembly and the first woman from Latin America and the Caribbean to preside over this body, since its foundation in 1945.

A total of 128 member states, out of the 193 that make up the United Nations, voted for the candidature of Espinosa who ran for the position against the permanent representative of Honduras to the United Nations, Mary Elizabeth Flores.

During her tenure as the 73rd President of the United Nations General Assembly, Espinosa convened a group of women leaders to promote awareness and international commitment to boosting political participation of women. She held several high-level events on women’s empowerment and political participation and gathered woman Heads of State and Government and other leading female figures to advance the gender equality agenda. During her presidency she chaired the adoption of the United Nations Declaration on the Rights of Peasants in November 2018, the Global Compact on Refugees and the Global Compact for Safe, Orderly and Regular Migration in December 2018.

Espinosa launched the International Year of Indigenous Languages in February 2019 and spearheaded the high-level event on culture and sustainable development in May 2019.

As president of the United Nations General Assembly, she promoted a worldwide campaign against the use of single-use plastics and achieved the complete elimination of single-use plastics in the United Nations headquarters in New York and Geneva.

In 2020, Espinosa was nominated by the heads of government of Antigua and Barbuda and Sant Vincent and the Grenadines for the position of secretary-general of the Organization of American States. She ran against incumbent Luis Almagro, nominated by Colombia. Almagro won his reappointment with 23 votes against 10 in the election held on 20 March that year. Her home country of Ecuador did not support her candidacy.

Before starting her political and diplomatic career, Espinosa was Associate Professor and Researcher at the Latin American Faculty of Social Sciences FLACSO, where she established and coordinated the Program on Socio-Environmental Studies. She served as advisor in biodiversity, climate change, and indigenous peoples’ policies (1999-2005), and later as regional director for South America of the International Union for the Conservation of Nature UICN (2005-2007).

Other activities
- International Gender Champions (IGC). Member

- World Future Council, Member

- World Academy of Art and Science, Fellow

- Fellow at the Bosch Academy.

-	Commissioner to the Lancet COVID-19 Commission.

-	Member of the High-Level Advisory Council for the United Nations Alliance of Civilizations, UNAOC.

-	Member of the Multi-Stakeholder Steering Committee of the Generation Equality Forum and the Beijing + 25.

-	Member of the Political Advisory Panel of the Universal Health Coverage 2030 Movement, UHC2030.

-	Member of the Group of Women Leaders for Change and Inclusion, GWL. Liaison with the United Nations.

-	Member of the Strategic Committee of the SDSN Science Panel for the Amazon, SPA.

-	Member of the UNDP Human Development Report Advisory Panel on Human Security.

-	Founding Member of the Centre for UN Studies at the University of Buckingham.

Espinosa acts as a Goodwill Ambassador for the Latin American and Caribbean Fund for the Development of the Indigenous Peoples, FILAC, and for the Common Home of Humanity.

Awards and honors

-	Awarded with the 2020 Sundance Film Festival Women’s Leadership Celebration. The 7th annual event, hosted by Zions Bank, January 2020.

-	The 2019 Rehabilitation International Award for Outstanding Achievements in innovation “for her Innovative work in advancing the rights of persons with disabilities globally”.

-	Declared 100 Women BBC as one of the 100 inspiring and influential women from around the world for 2019.

-	The Atahualpa Medal for Merit, Gran Cruz (Grand Cross) class, September 24, 2014, delivered by the Armed Forces of Ecuador.

-	The Orden “El Sol del Perú” (The Order of the Sun of Peru), Gran Cruz (Grand Cross) class, February 23, 2007.

References

External links

|-

|-

|-

|-

|-

|-

|-

1964 births
Living people
Defence ministers of Ecuador
Ecuadorian poets
Ecuadorian women poets
Female defence ministers
Female foreign ministers
Foreign ministers of Ecuador
PAIS Alliance politicians
People from Salamanca
Permanent Representatives of Ecuador to the United Nations
Pontifical Catholic University of Ecuador alumni
Women government ministers of Ecuador
Ecuadorian women ambassadors
BBC 100 Women
Presidents of the United Nations General Assembly
21st-century Ecuadorian women politicians
21st-century Ecuadorian politicians